Obg-like ATPase 1 is an enzyme that in humans is encoded by the OLA1 gene.
Ola1 belongs to the protein family of Obg-like GTPases but defines an exceptional example of a protein that has evolved altered nucleotide specificity and binds adenosine triphosphate (ATP) with higher affinity than guanosine triphosphate (GTP).

References

Further reading

External links